SkyScreamer is an amusement ride located at several Six Flags theme parks in North America. Designed by Funtime, an Austrian ride manufacturer, the attraction is one of their "Star Flyer" models. Since 2011, Six Flags has installed SkyScreamers in ten of their parks.

Riders aboard SkyScreamer are carried aloft in two-person swing-like chairs attached to a rotating gondola mounted on a central tower. When the gondola reaches the top of the tower, riders are swung in a wide circle at speeds approaching , with expansive views of the adjacent countryside. The ride is marketed to both thrill-ride enthusiasts and patrons seeking a more family-friendly experience.

History
The first two SkyScreamers were announced in late 2010 for Six Flags Discovery Kingdom and Six Flags St. Louis for the 2011 season. On May 14, 2011, SkyScreamer officially opened at Six Flags St. Louis, where it replaced the Riverview Racer. On May 27, 2011, SkyScreamer made its debut at Six Flags Discovery Kingdom, adjacent to the Medusa roller coaster.

In September 2011, Six Flags announced the addition of SkyScreamer to two more parks, Six Flags Fiesta Texas and Six Flags Great Adventure. On January 19, 2012, Six Flags announced that La Ronde would also receive a Star Flyer tower. On May 19, 2012, La Ronde opened their attraction, using the name Vol Ultime (French for "Ultimate Flight") instead of SkyScreamer. On May 23, 2012, Six Flags Great Adventure opened SkyScreamer as part of their new Adventure Alley section, which was based around the idea of retro-style amusement rides. On May 27, 2012, Six Flags Fiesta Texas opened their SkyScreamer in the Spassburg section of the park; season passholders were allowed to experience the ride one day earlier.

In July 2012, Six Flags New England submitted plans to the city of Agawam, Massachusetts requesting special approval to construct a  Star Flyer ride, as the proposed height exceeded the city's height limit. The planning documents revealed that the ride would replace the park's Skycoaster, "Taz's Dare Devil Dive" as well as the former spot of "Catapult".

However, when Six Flags announced its 2013 capital investments in August 2012, the Six Flags New England Star Flyer was not included. Instead, two other parks, Six Flags Over Texas and Six Flags Over Georgia, were set to receive SkyScreamer attractions. Six Flags Over Georgia's  version replaced the Wheelie and officially debuted on May 24, 2013, after two weekends of passholder previews. Six Flags Over Texas' model, dubbed the Texas SkyScreamer, was awarded the title of the "world's tallest swing carousel ride" by Guinness World Records.

On August 29, 2013, Six Flags announced that they would be adding the New England SkyScreamer to Six Flags New England in 2014. The over 400-foot-tall ride debuted officially on May 23, 2014 in the park's North End section. At the time of its debut, New England SkyScreamer held the title for the tallest swing ride. 

As part of its 2015 attractions presentation on August 28, 2014, Six Flags announced that Six Flags Mexico will be the next park to receive a SkyScreamer, a  model and the only attraction of its kind in Latin America.

Two years later after the announcement of Six Flags Mexico addition, Six Flags announced that they would be adding yet another Funtime Star Flyer for the 2017 season after a hiatus of building the swing ride back to back. Six Flags America announced on September 1, 2016, that for the following season they would be constructing the tallest ride in the park, Wonder Woman Lasso of Truth a  SkyScreamer. The ride would become one of the first SkyScreamers to be themed to a DC Comics character. Six Flags Mexico rethemed their SkyScreamer to Supergirl in 2018 to be a part of the new theme area the tower was already located in.

Announced in 2018, Six Flags added a SkyScreamer installation to Six Flags Darien Lake for the 2019 season. The 242-foot-tall ride was labeled the tallest ride in the state of New York.

Ride experience

While the heights of the various SkyScreamer installations vary from park to park, the basic operation of the ride is consistent. Riders sit in one of 16 two-seat chairs connected to a gondola mounted on a central tower, which brings the gondola up and down. A seat belt is placed over the rider's waist to keep them firmly in their seat, and a lap bar is fastened into place. When the ride cycle begins, the gondola rises to the top of the tower, beginning to spin slowly around the central tower and picking up speed as it ascends further. The gondola remains at the top of the tower for a period of time, then it descends and slows down slightly before returning to the top. At the end of the cycle, the gondola lowers to the ground and slows its rotation such that, by the time it reaches the bottom of the tower, all rotation ceases and the riders are able to depart. Optionally, SkyScreamer can be set to rotate in the opposite direction during its cycle, such that riders are traveling backwards. Thus far, the installations at St. Louis, Discovery Kingdom, Fiesta Texas, New England and La Ronde have operated in this manner, with each running them in this mode during special events or as a limited-time promotion.

The New England SkyScreamer and Texas SkyScreamer differ from the standard models, although the actual ride experience is intended to be the same. The gondola of the two rides hold 12 two-seat chairs instead of 16. When the gondola reaches full height, the chairs rotate in a larger circle——but at a slower speed—.

Installations
All rides were installed by Ride Entertainment Group, who handle all of Funtime's operations in North America.

Reception
SkyScreamer has been described as being a "classic" and "retro" ride by the press. It is marketed as a compromise between riders who prefer roller coasters and similar thrills and those who prefer more family-friendly rides. Roller coaster enthusiasts, who are often sought out to sample new thrill rides, have been generally positive about the attractions. Frankie Gobel, a roller coaster fan whose father, Charlie Gobel, wrote a book about their experiences entitled Flying With Frankie: Three Hundred Days in Amusement Parks Riding Roller Coasters With My Son, described the ride as not being "your typical swing set" commenting that "It’s not too intense for Mom or too dull for a teenager. It’s the perfect family ride - assuming your family has a strong stomach."

Gary Slade, the publisher of Amusement Today magazine, said that while SkyScreamer doesn't have the same drawing power as a new roller coaster, it still was the type of ride parks needed to install to keep guests returning. Slade said, in regards to the attraction at Six Flags Fiesta Texas, "I think it's really going to be a huge hit for them."

See also
 WindSeeker, a similar ride by Mondial at several Cedar Fair parks
 2011 in amusement parks
 2012 in amusement parks
 2013 in amusement parks

References

External links

 Official website for first installation, Six Flags St. Louis
 Attraction model home page

Amusement rides introduced in 2011
Amusement rides introduced in 2012
Amusement rides introduced in 2013
Amusement rides introduced in 2015
Amusement rides manufactured by Funtime
Six Flags attractions
Six Flags Discovery Kingdom
Six Flags Fiesta Texas
Six Flags Great Adventure
Six Flags México
Six Flags Over Georgia
Six Flags St. Louis
Swing rides
Towers in California
Towers in Texas
Towers in New Jersey
Towers in Georgia (U.S. state)
Towers in Mexico
Towers in Missouri